Denmon is a surname. Notable people with the surname include:

Marcus Denmon (born 1990), American professional basketball player
Noa Denmon (born 1995 or 1996), American illustrator

See also
Dedmon